The 2014 Judo Grand Slam Tokyo was held in Tokyo, Japan, from 5 to 7 December 2014.

Medal summary

Men's events

Women's events

Source Results

Medal table

References

External links
 

2014 IJF World Tour
2014 Judo Grand Slam
Judo
Grand Slam, 2015
Judo
Judo